Roosendaal is a railway station in the city of Roosendaal, Netherlands. The station opened on 3 July 1854 on the Antwerp–Lage Zwaluwe railway and is the beginning of the Roosendaal–Vlissingen railway. Roosendaal was the first station in North Brabant to be built. Roosendaal is also a border station between the Netherlands and Belgium. Trains in Belgium run on the left side of double-track whereas in the Netherlands right-hand running is the norm. At some borders, the changeover is achieved by using a flyover, but at Roosendaal trains stop and await a signal to allow them to proceed to the opposite track.

Since June 2015 there has been an NMBS ticket machine at the station to buy Belgian train tickets.

Train services
The station is served by the following services:

2x per hour intercity service Amsterdam - Haarlem - Leiden - The Hague - Rotterdam - Dordrecht - Roosendaal - Vlissingen (Between Roosendaal and Vlissingen: On weekdays except evenings 1x per hour express service, only stopping at Bergen op Zoom, Goes and Middelburg and 1x per hour local service stopping at all stations, on evenings and weekends 2x per hour local service)
2x per hour intercity services Zwolle - Deventer - Zutphen - Arnhem - Nijmegen - 's-Hertogenbosch - Tilburg - Breda - Roosendaal
2x per hour local service (sprinter) Dordrecht - Roosendaal
1x per hour local service (sprinter) Roosendaal - Vlissingen (only on weekdays except evenings)
1x per hour local service (stoptrein) Roosendaal - Essen - Antwerp - Antwerp-South - Puurs

As of April 9, 2018 the international service Amsterdam - Brussels will be running on the HSL-Zuid with a stop at Breda and does not call at Dordrecht and Roosendaal anymore. Passengers for Belgium can take a train to Breda and change trains there or can take the local service Roosendaal - Puurs and change trains at Antwerp for Mechelen, Brussels Airport and Brussels

Bus services

Roosendaal is served by city bus services (stadsbussen) as well as regional bus services (streekbussen). All bus services are operated by Arriva

Stadsbussen

There are 4 city bus lines. From the railway station the city bus lines provides services to/from:

 Roselaar bus station (downtown area)
 Bravis Ziekenhuis (Hospital)
 WVS (Training company)
 The neighbourhoods Burgerhout, Bovendonk, Fatimawijk, Kalsdonk, Kortendijk, Kroeven, Langdonk, Tolberg and Weihoek

The neighbourhood Westrand and the Rosada Factory Outlet Center are served by regional bus services (see also: Streekbussen)

The routes of the city buses are as follows:

Streekbussen

The regional bus lines provides services to/from:

 Roselaar busstation (downtown area)
 The Rosada Factory Outlet Center
 Zegestede Cemetery
 The neighbourhoods Fatimawijk and Westrand
 The nearby cities Bergen op Zoom, Breda and Etten-Leur
 Villages around Roosendaal

The routes of the regional buses, serving Roosendaal, are as follows:

References

External links

NS website 
Dutch Public Transport journey planner 

Railway stations opened in 1854
Railway stations in North Brabant
Railway stations on the Staatslijn F
Transport in Roosendaal
1854 establishments in the Netherlands
Railway stations in the Netherlands opened in the 19th century